Valletta Lions RFC is a defunct Maltese rugby club in Valletta. They competed in the Malta Rugby Union National Championship.

External links
 Valletta Lions RFC

Maltese rugby union teams
Sport in Valletta